Craig George McEwan (born 3 October 1977 in Glasgow) is a Scottish footballer and coach and current manager of St Cadoc's Y.C.

A right full-back, McEwan has played in the Scottish Football League First Division for Raith Rovers and Ayr United and is a former Scotland under-21 international.

Career
McEwan began his career with Clyde. His string of good performances alerted other clubs, and he was transferred to Raith Rovers in 1997. After three years in Kirkcaldy, McEwan moved to Ayr United, where he would stay for the next two seasons.  Three years with Dumbarton followed, before a two-year spell with Brechin City. He left Brechin in January 2007 to join Stenhousemuir in a swap deal with David Murie.

McEwan dropped to Junior level with Linlithgow Rose in February 2009 then had a spell at Pollok in 2010 before joining Glenafton Athletic in November the same year.

In October 2014, McEwan took on his first managerial position at Arthurlie, however he returned to take charge of former club Glenafton three months later.

On 11 October 2020, McEwan resigned as manager of Glenafton. The club had released a statement earlier announcing they would not be participating in the inaugural season of the West of Scotland League due to concerns relating to the COVID-19 pandemic.

St Cadoc's Y.C announced McEwan as their new manager on 21 October 2020.

References

External links
Official website profile

1977 births
Living people
Footballers from Glasgow
Scottish footballers
Clyde F.C. players
Raith Rovers F.C. players
Ayr United F.C. players
Dumbarton F.C. players
Brechin City F.C. players
Stenhousemuir F.C. players
Scotland under-21 international footballers
Scottish Football League players
Scottish Junior Football Association players
Pollok F.C. players
Linlithgow Rose F.C. players
Glenafton Athletic F.C. players
Arthurlie F.C. players
Scottish football managers
Association football fullbacks
Scottish Junior Football Association managers